Typhonia ciliaris is a moth of the Psychidae family. It is found in central, southern and south-western Europe.

References

Moths described in 1810
Typhonia